945 Madison Avenue, also known as the Breuer Building, is a museum building in the Upper East Side of Manhattan, New York City. The Marcel Breuer-designed structure was built from 1964 to 1966 as the third home for the Whitney Museum of American Art. The Whitney moved out in 2014, after nearly 50 years in the building. In 2016, it was leased to the Metropolitan Museum of Art and became the Met Breuer, which closed in 2020. The building currently houses the Frick Madison, the temporary home of the Frick Collection set for a two-year period that began in March 2021. There are no public plans for the building after the Met's lease expires in 2023.

The five story building occupies a roughly square plot at Madison Avenue and 75th Street. The building, described as Brutalist or Modernist, has exterior faces of variegated granite and exposed concrete. It has stark angular shapes, including cantilevered floors progressively extending atop its entryway, resembling an inverted ziggurat. The design, controversial though lauded by notable critics at its opening, has seen more universally positive reviews into the present day. The building is a contributing property to the Upper East Side Historic District, a New York City and national historic district.

Site

The museum building occupies the southeast corner of the intersection of Madison Avenue and 75th Street. The property is considered to be within the Lenox Hill neighborhood within the Upper East Side, one block east of Central Park. The original building's site measures , occupying 0.3 acres.

The site was formerly occupied by six 1880s rowhouses like those that surround it; they had been demolished before the museum purchased the property. The site was an elegant residential area before World War II; after the war, the area took on new luxury apartments and art dealers, becoming the "gallery center of New York". It became an upscale commercial area by the mid 2010s, surrounded by retail shops for global fashion brands, luxury condominiums, and a large Apple Store. The 21st century site changes are partially attributed to development spurred by the Met Breuer's opening in 2016.

Design

945 Madison Avenue was designed by Marcel Breuer & Associates  primarily Breuer himself and his partner Hamilton P. Smith. Michael H. Irving was the consulting architect, and Paul Weidlinger was the structural engineer. The work was the most major in New York City for Breuer, and one of the most important of his career. It was his first museum commission, and his first and only remaining work in Manhattan. Breuer was originally a student of the Bauhaus architecture and design school, though later became one of the leading figures in "New Brutalism" or Brutalism.

Sources variously describe the building's architectural style to be Brutalist or part of the larger Modernist movement. It has been described as a Brutalist structure due to its top-heavy, massive, uninviting, and bunker-like shape, its primal form, as well as its use of exposed raw concrete. Notable statements supporting the building's Brutalist architecture come from Ada Louise Huxtable in 1966 and Phaidon's Atlas of Brutalist Architecture, published in 2018. The Metropolitan Museum of Art discouraged the association; saying that Breuer never associated himself with Brutalism, and that the building had a colorful, yet subtle, spectrum of colors, and that it overall was supposed to engage visitors. The building's use of concrete was described by Sarah Williams Goldhagen as less of an aesthetic than a position. Goldhagen stated that progressive architects at the time had to choose between using steel and glass or reinforced concrete, generally sticking with one or the other. Steel and glass began to become associated with commercial buildings and mass production, while concrete gave the impression of monumentality, authenticity, and age.

The overall design has been likened to an inverted ziggurat, at least since 1964; Progressive Architecture likened it to the stepped Pyramid of Djoser in Egypt. The building was designed in the spirit of the nearby Guggenheim Museum  another unique artistic landmark created by a renowned architect, completed seven years earlier. The Guggenheim, too, had its basic form come from an overturned ziggurat, as its architect Frank Lloyd Wright stated in a 1945 Time interview. Architecture critics noticed, calling the Whitney a "squared-off Guggenheim". Breuer designed the building in response to specific desires from the Whitney Museum  a unique and unmistakable identity, a building that expresses the personality of its institution.

The five-story building, as stated in 1964, counters gravity as well as uniformity, poor lighting, crowded space, and a lack of identity (most of which were issues for the Whitney's prior spaces). The building utilizes "close-to-earth" materials that weather over time, intended to express age beautifully. Breuer chose coarse granite, split slate floors, bronze doors and fittings, and teakwood.

Exterior

The building's exterior lies in stark contrast with the streetscape of Madison Avenue. It uses reinforced concrete with variegated gray granite cladding. The structure includes a cantilevered facade in progressive steps overshadowing the Madison Avenue street front. Breuer stated that the cantilevered floors help receive visitors before they enter the museum building. The Madison Avenue entrance also features an areaway, or sunken stone courtyard. Above the areaway is a canopied concrete bridge into the building's lobby, likened to a portal and sculpture by Architectural Forum.

The majority of the building is faced with dark gray granite, with white veining resembling curling smoke. There are 1,500 slabs of stone, each weighing 500-600 lbs. The west side of the lower level and ground floor is almost fully faced in glass. Besides this, the building is predominantly windowless. The majority of the upper floor windows are simply decorative, and meant to prevent claustrophobia. These trapezoidal windows jut out from the exterior walls, and visually appear to have been placed at random. The windows are set at angles from 20 to 25 degrees, pointed away from the path of the sun to avoid direct light from entering the building. The Madison Avenue facade only has a single window of this design, an oversized cyclopean pane.

The north and south walls are load-bearing; the walls are all made of reinforced concrete. The party walls, on the building's south and east sides, are massive projecting walls of unadorned and rough reinforced concrete, separated and distinct from the more elegant rest of the exterior. The north and west walls originally formed a parapet on the fifth floor, hiding the building's windowed office space from street view while bringing light into the space.

Interior

The building originally had  of interior space. Only about 30,000 square feet was for exhibition space; the remainder was for offices, storage, meeting rooms, a library, a restoration laboratory, stairs, elevators, and other spaces.

The building was designed with an earth-colored interior, utilizing concrete, bluestone, and oiled bronze. The floors are of bluestone tile; the walls are white, gray, or granite-faced and relatively blank, allowing for plenty of space to hang paintings. The ceilings use a suspended grid of concrete coffers, specially designed with rails to allow for movable partition walls. Ceiling heights vary; the second and third floors are 12'9", while the fourth floor is 17'6".

As first designed, the building had a lobby, coat room, small gallery, and loading dock on its first floor. The second, third, and fourth floors were dedicated to gallery space, each progressively larger than the space beneath it. Administrative offices were on the fifth floor, and a large mechanical penthouse acted as the sixth floor. The lower floors were designed for a sculpture gallery and courtyard, a kitchen and dining space, and storage. While exhibition space was made relatively bare at the museum's opening, its permanent gallery space made use of carpets, woven wall coverings, and comfortable furniture to make the space more intimate.
While operating as the Met Breuer, the interior spaces on the second and third floor were divided into various gallery rooms, compromising the original design of large open spaces.

The building's staircase is a "functional sculpture", changing gradually and subtly in dimensions and proportions between floors, though materials are consistent throughout.

Lighting was designed to be almost entirely artificial, with only a few windows, angled to prevent direct sunlight from entering. Lights were by Edison Price, and hung from the concrete grid ceilings  both spot lighting and indirect lighting.

Lobby

The lobby contains an information desk, coatroom, and waiting spaces. Its ceiling is taken up by white circular light fixtures, each with a single bare silver-tipped bulb. The interior is rich in materials  granite, wood, bronze, and leather, though muted in color. Concrete walls in the lobby are bush-hammered, and framed by smooth boardformed edges, noted by the Met's contemporary art chair as a delightful attention to detail.

The lobby, renovated extensively in preparation for the Met Breuer's opening, had an unoriginal gift shop structure removed, and its walls and sculptural ceiling lights were repaired. The room now features a  matte black LED media wall, a television screen to indicate pricing, exhibitions, and other information.

Dining space

The Breuer Building has a lower level dining space that has seen numerous tenants. In 2011, New York restaurateur Danny Meyer opened the restaurant Untitled, which moved along with the Whitney to Lower Manhattan in 2015. The restaurant permanently closed in 2021.

During 945 Madison's operation as the Met Breuer, it initially housed a pop-up Blue Bottle Coffee shop on the fifth floor. It later housed the restaurant Flora Bar (known before opening as Estela Breuer) in its lower level and sunken sculpture court. It was operated by restaurateurs Ignacio Mattos and Thomas Carter, and was critically acclaimed (with two stars from The New York Times), though hindered by news of a toxic work environment. The space was renovated at the Met Breuer's opening at an estimated cost of $2 million. The restaurant and museum closed during the COVID-19 pandemic, and it was announced in February 2021 that the restaurant will not reopen when the Frick gallery opens in March. A cafe with light dishes and snacks, operated by Joe Coffee, will operate in the space during the Frick's tenancy.

History

1964–2014: Whitney Museum

The Whitney Museum was founded to house about 700 works of American art, after Gertrude Vanderbilt Whitney had offered 500 of the works to the Metropolitan Museum of Art, which declined it. Whitney then decided to form her own art museum in 1929. The Whitney Museum's first home at 8 West 8th Street, which opened to the public in 1931, quickly became inadequate. The Whitney moved to its second location, an annex of the Museum of Modern Art (MoMA) at 22 West 54th Street, in 1954; this too was insufficient for the museum's needs.

The Whitney began looking for sites for a new museum building in 1958, which would be three times as large as the existing facility. In the 1960s, the Whitney's board was opened up beyond the Whitney family and close advisors (adding members including first lady Jacqueline Kennedy). The new members desired matching the Whitney to other major museums in the city. The Guggenheim had constructed a new museum in 1959 and MoMA expanded in 1951 and 1964. The board requested Breuer design the new museum in 1961. Breuer was chosen when he and Louis Kahn presented ideas; the two were previously chosen out of five radical architects who had lacked major public works in New York City. The new building would be assertive and experimental, a recognizable icon defying the near-anonymous site the Whitney had left, in the shadow of the MoMA. Breuer's building was the museum's third home, and sometimes considered its first permanent location. The facility tripled the Whitney's space while adding a library and restaurant.

In early 1963, the Whitney identified a site at Madison Avenue and 75th Street on the Upper East Side for the new museum building. The site was formerly occupied by six 1880s rowhouses like those that surround it; they were owned by developer and art collector Ian Woodner, who demolished them before the museum purchased the property. He had considered the site for an apartment tower but the project did not make it to fruition, prompting the land's sale to the Whitney. The Whitney chose the site as it was midway between the Met, Guggenheim, MoMA, and Jewish Museum, in an area becoming full with private art galleries. The decision to acquire the lot was publicly announced in June 1963, while Breuer's plans were publicly announced that December.

The building was designed in 1963, and built from 1964 to 1966. The museum had an estimated cost of $3–4 million in 1964, though ended up costing $6 million. It opened on September 28, 1966, in an event with Jackie Kennedy, who had been a trustee of the Whitney since 1963. In a member preview event the night before, the museum was given four warnings by telephone of a bomb in the building. A police search yielded nothing. The preview was also attended by Kennedy, along with the Whitney family, the architects, and museum board members and staff.

The first of the Whitney Biennial events took place in 1973 in the Breuer Building. This first event filled the museum with 221 artists' works. The most memorable Whitney Biennial took place in the building as well, in 1993. That event, by curator Elisabeth Sussman, showed works involving race, gender, sexuality, AIDS, and socioeconomic issues. Reviews were antagonistic at the time, though the exhibition later proved to be influential.

Expansion proposals
The institution grappled with space problems for decades, prompting several satellite museums and exhibition spaces in the 1970s and 1980s. The Whitney considered a significant number of expansion proposals for the Breuer Building, an unusual proportion versus what was actually built. Five different architects (including three Pritzker Prize winners) provided a total of eight proposals; only one modest design was actually built. The expansions were prompted by growing crowds in recent years. The building was believed to function well with 1,000 visitors per day, though would reach three to five thousand on busier days. The Whitney thus acquired five brownstone buildings south to 74th Street, and had Breuer design knockout panels in the outer walls at each floor, with plans for eventual expansion.

In 1978, the Whitney's trustees considered a 35-story tower expansion to the building's south, amid plans for MoMA's museum-condominium "Museum Tower". The plan would let Italian developers create a luxury mixed-use tower with Whitney galleries on its lower floors. The proposed high-tech design was created by the British Norman Foster Associates and Derek Walker Associates. The project was cancelled when it was pointed out that height restrictions would make the mixed-use development unprofitable. The next expansion proposal was by Michael Graves, first announced in 1981, three months after Breuer's death. The first proposal came in May 1985, revised in 1987 and 1988. Graves' postmodern additions were heavily condemned for their bulk and for not harmonizing with the existing building. The first polarizing proposal was met with a petition against the design, signed by I.M. Pei, Isamu Noguchi, and about 600 other art and architecture professionals. Breuer's wife Constance and his architect partner Hamilton Smith also weighed in against the design, preferring Breuer's work be torn down. Certain critics prompted the Whitney's board to request the 1987 revision, and his final revision was also disliked. His main advocate, director Thomas Armstrong III, resigned in 1990 before the third revision's approval process had begun.

The board of the Whitney still desired an expansion, though now aimed for a near-imperceptible change. The museum purchased surrounding townhouses (five on Madison, two on 74th, and a two-story building between the two sets). The museum board hired Gluckman Mayner Architects to perform a $135 million two-phase renovation, spanning from 1995 to 1998. The expansion involved renovating three townhouses to create office space, connecting them to the museum via Breuer's knockout panels. A new two-story library was built within a rear yard space. The Breuer Building's fifth floor terraces were enclosed, and the floor was converted into gallery space. The building was also extensively cleaned and given new HVAC systems. The work was made to look invisible  the new galleries appeared original, and the new administrative spaces preserved the historic brownstones' exteriors and much of the interiors. The new fifth floor gallery was funded by then-chairman Leonard Lauder, and was named for him and his wife.

In 2001, the Whitney announced another expansion plan to further increase space, this one designed by Rem Koolhaas and his firm OMA. The proposed building would be enormous, cantilevering above and over the Breuer Building. The museum kept the proposal relatively secret, and abandoned it in 2003, before any review processes, citing economics and bad timing. The board rejection prompted its director Maxwell L. Anderson to resign, compared to Armstrong III's resignation in 1990.

The work was controversial, seen by some preservationists as too severe, and by some in the architecture field as not bold enough.

The Whitney hired Renzo Piano to design an addition in 2004; Piano proposed a nine-story tower inset into the block, connected to the Breuer building with glass bridges. His proposal would leave the Breuer Building and surrounding brownstones mostly untouched. Preservationists worked to save two brownstones that would be demolished; that paired with skyrocketing construction costs largely doomed the project. The Whitney abandoned Piano's proposal in 2005, deciding instead for him to design a new building for the museum in Lower Manhattan. The Whitney operated at this location until 2014, until it moved to a new building in the West Village and Meatpacking District the following year.

The Whitney's last exhibit in the building was a retrospective of Jeff Koons in 2014; it was the largest survey the Whitney made dedicated to a single artist, and was among the Whitney's highest-attended events.

The Whitney still maintains ownership of the building, so its donor plaques remain, as does Dwellings, a miniature work of art by Charles Simonds, located in the building's stairwell as well as the rooftop and windowsill of neighboring 940 Madison Avenue.

2015–2020: Met Breuer

The Metropolitan Museum of Art, looking to build its presence in the modern and contemporary art scenes, agreed to lease the building in 2011, to enter into effect around 2015. The museum was also looking to display its contemporary and modern art while its Fifth Avenue building's wing was renovated, making the move potentially temporary from the beginning. The building underwent a $12.95 million renovation ahead of the Met opening. This included a thorough cleaning, led by Beyer Blinder Belle. The architects also stripped decades of additions, decluttering the lobby of posters, postcard racks, and wires. Floors were re-waxed, and the lobby's lights were replaced with custom LED bulbs. The restoration was careful to preserve elements of natural aging; Breuer chose materials like wood and bronze that would change positively over time.

The Metropolitan Museum of Art opened the Met Breuer at 945 Madison Avenue in 2016, and named the branch after its architect. The museum housed its contemporary art in the modern building for the next four years. The Met announced its plan to hand over the building to the Frick Collection in September 2018, off-loading three years of rent from its eight year lease. The plan was set for the Frick to open in 2020 in the space. Critics of the Met Breuer viewed the news as confirmation that the Met branch was a bad idea, and the institution's president stated that its future was in the main building. The Met simultaneously announced it will renovate its modern and contemporary galleries, at a proposed cost of $500 million, modified from a 2014 announcement of a $600 million renovation. The Met Breuer cost $18 million to operate each year. The planned sublease would cost the Frick $45 million, an undisclosed portion of the Met's lease from the Whitney Museum.

The museum was originally set to close in July 2020, after its last exhibit, though it closed temporarily during the COVID-19 pandemic in March of that year. That June, the Met decided to close its space there permanently, despite the short-lived exhibition.

2021–present: Frick Madison

The museum building opened in March 2021 as the Frick Madison, a temporary gallery of the Frick Collection. The Frick has been located five blocks south since 1935, though amid planned renovation, the museum will operate at 945 Madison for about two years. The Frick Collection was looking to open a temporary exhibit during its planned 2020–2022 renovations, and sought the Guggenheim, which was only available for four months. The Metropolitan Museum of Art lent use of the Breuer building instead; the Met had leased the building from the Whitney in a deal set to expire in 2023.

The move was seen as remarkable, given that Henry Clay Frick's will stipulated that his purchases (about two-thirds of the museum's holdings) cannot be lent to any other institutions. The Frick Madison's opening became the first and potentially only time these works are being moved. The building houses its old masters collection, including 104 paintings, along with sculptures, vases, and clocks. The artwork is presented like how it was in Frick Mansion, with no protective glass or descriptive texts, though in a much more stark setting than the ornate mansion has. Dutch and Flemish paintings occupy the second floor, while Italian and Spanish works take up the third, along with Mughal carpets and Chinese porcelain. The fourth floor features British and French works. The temporary museum is the second reported occurrence of non-Modern works exhibited in the Modernist Breuer building, after the Met Breuer's inaugural exhibit. Here The Frick Collection will maintain visitorship, membership, and its public attention, rather than if it shuttered for two or more years. Most of the 1,500-piece collection of artwork is being placed in storage in the Breuer Building, and about 300 are on display on the second through fourth floors.

The Frick's exhibits are sparsely placed on dark gray walls, with most walls only holding one to two paintings. There are no barriers and few display cases, allowing guests to see works unimpaired. Taller works are set low to the ground, giving an illusion of entering the scenes depicted. There are no plaques or signs, save for the artist's name on some frames. Visitors are encouraged to use the museum's app instead.

The building's future after 2023 is uncertain. There are no announced tenants beyond the Frick Collection, and the Whitney Museum cannot sell the building for the foreseeable future. The restriction was set in a $131 million gift from Leonard Lauder, former board chairman emeritus, the largest donation in the museum's history. The museum was reported to be considering a sale as of late 2021, however.

Impact

Critical reception

The building was controversial to the public at its opening; comments likened it to a fortress or garage, while some admired it for being striking or romantic. It was nevertheless well-received as a masterpiece by critics in the 1960s, in architecture, art, and general magazines and newspapers. In 1966, Ada Louise Huxtable of the New York Times referred to the building as "harsh and handsome", and a site that grows on the viewer slowly over time, though she admitted it was "the most disliked building in New York". Huxtable noted that the building may be too severe and gloomy for many people's tastes, echoed by art critic Emily Genauer in the same year, who called it "oppresively heavy", and notably coined it as "the Madison Avenue Monster". Progressive Architecture, in 1966, criticized the 75th Street facade for being incongruous with the Madison Avenue facade, and for appearing empty save for its sculptural windows.

In 2010, the Times architecture critic Christopher Gray called it "ornery and menacing", perhaps "New York's most bellicose work of architecture". In a reply, architectural historian Victoria Newhouse called the museum one of the most successfully designed in the world; she had traveled to hundreds in order to write two books about museum architecture. She prompted Huxtable to give a new statement in support of the building, after Gray had taken her words out of context in his review.

Breuer and the Whitney sought to build a controversial structure. Breuer's commission brief (contradicting itself) told him to create an assertive or even controversial structure that represents the Whitney's experimental art, and with a clear definition and monumentality, though aiming to be "as human as possible" and reflect the museum's custom for "warmth and intimacy". Critics supported the controversial design; Peter Blake stated that "Any museum of art that does not, somehow, shake up the neighbor-hood is at least a partial failure. Whatever else Breuer's museum may do to its neighbors, it will never bore them."

The museum's design won Marcel Breuer the 1968 Albert S. Bard Award for Excellence in Architecture and Urban Design, and a 1970 Honor Award from the AIA Journal.

Landmark designations
Architectural Forum, in 1966, stated that the building was "intended to be a landmark". It was first listed in 1981, as a contributing structure to the Upper East Side Historic District (as designated by New York City's Landmarks Preservation Commission). Despite this, it was listed as a noncontributing structure in the National Register of Historic Places (NRHP) district of the same name in 1984. The museum was independently added to the State Register of Historic Places in June 1986 and was deemed eligible for a standalone entry in the National Register in September of that year. In 2006, the NRHP's historic district listing was revised, with one of the modifications being to now list the museum building as a contributing structure.

Influence

The building came to define the Whitney Museum's image, as its iconic home for almost 50 years.

Marcel Breuer's work with the Whitney Museum prompted an invitation to design for the Cleveland Museum of Art. Breuer was the only person invited to submit a design for its north wing, as he showed an understanding for museum needs and understanding for materials with the Whitney project. Breuer's wing opened in 1971, designed with similarities to the Whitney Museum, including a cantilevered concrete entrance canopy outside and a suspended coffered grid inside.

Breuer's work for the Whitney also influenced Atlanta Public Library director Carlton C. Rochell, who nominated Breuer to design a new central library; Breuer and his partner Hamilton Smith won the commission, paired with the Atlanta firm Stevens & Wilkinson. The Atlanta Central Library, completed in 1980, is seen as a "confident progression" of the Whitney design.

The Breuer Building also influenced the design of the new Whitney Museum in Lower Manhattan, designed by Renzo Piano. The building, opened in 2015, also features cantilevering floor plates that progressively extend over a portion of the street; both museum buildings also feature oversized elevators.

A 2017 exhibit at the Met Breuer, Breuer Revisited: New Photographs by Luisa Lambri and Bas Princen, featured artistic photographs of four of Marcel Breuer's works, including 945 Madison Avenue.

References

Further reading
 
 
  For more information about the proposed OMA expansion.

External links

 
 Frick Madison website
 Entry at the Marcel Breuer Digital Archive, Syracuse University Libraries
 Marcel Breuer Papers: Project Files and Photographs
 

1966 establishments in New York City
Art museums established in 1966
Art museums and galleries in New York City
Buildings and structures completed in 1966
Contemporary art galleries in the United States
Marcel Breuer buildings
Museums in Manhattan
Brutalist architecture in New York City
Modernist architecture in New York City
Madison Avenue
Upper East Side